Denis Cosmin Ursu (born 10 January 2004) is a Romanian professional footballer who plays as a midfielder for Liga II side CSC 1599 Șelimbăr. He made his Liga I debut for Gaz Metan Mediaș, in a match against Dinamo București.

References

External links
 

2004 births
Living people
People from Mediaș
Romanian footballers
Association football midfielders
Liga I players
Liga II players
CS Gaz Metan Mediaș players
CSC 1599 Șelimbăr players